The Kuwait National Petroleum Company (KNPC) is the national oil refining company of Kuwait. Established in October 1960, KNPC handles the responsibility of oil refining, gas liquefaction, and distribution of petroleum goods within the local market. KNPC is also handling CFP (Clean Fuel project).

History 
Established in October 1960 as a share-holding company owned by the Kuwait government and private sector, KNPC became fully government-owned in 1975. Since 1968 the company had been exporting petroleum products from its Shuaiba Refinery.In April 2017 Kuwait closed the Shuaiba refinery, which was one of the oldest oil facilities in the region. In 1980, following the restructuring of the oil sector in Kuwait, KNPC was placed under the newly created Kuwait Petroleum Corporation (KPC), which was also government owned. Under this position, KNPC took control of distributing petroleum products within Kuwait, along with the ownership of the Mina Ahmadi and Mina Abdullah refineries.

Refineries 
 Mina Abdullah Refinery: Built in 1958 by the American Independent Oil Company, Mina Abdullah was passed to the Kuwaiti state in 1975 and transferred to KNPC in 1978. Spanning 7,835,000 m², and located 46 km south of Kuwait City, Mina Abdullah is capable of refining  (BPD).
 Mina Al-Ahmadi refinery: Initially built in 1949, the refinery was handed over to KNPC in 1980. In 2014 KNPC started the production of ultra-low-sulfur diesel (ULSD) at Mina Al-Ahmadi refinery.
 Shuaiba Refinery: Built in 1966, Shuaiba Refinery was the first refinery in the region to be built by a national company. The refinery spanned 1,332,000 m² and was located 50 km south of Kuwait City within the Shuaiba Industrial Area. In March 2017 the refinery was shut down in order that its facilities could be repurposed for the country's Clean Fuels Project (CFP).
 Al Zour Refinery: KNPC released plans to build a fourth refinery known as Al-Zour in 2006. In 2012 the plans were revamped because of the re-approval by the Supreme Petroleum Council of Kuwait. In May 2008, Kuwait National Petroleum Company awarded the four remaining EPC contracts: Process Package 1 was awarded to the Consortium of JGC Corporation and GS Engineering & Construction, Process Package 2 was awarded to SK Engineering & Construction, Storage Tanks Package was awarded to Daelim Industrial Company, Marine Works Package was awarded to Hyundai Engineering & Construction, and The Offsites & Utilities package was awarded to Fluor Corporation.

Recruitment 
KNPC provides scholarships and training and sponsors refinery operation specialization at the College of Technological Studies of The Public Authority for Applied Education and Training (PAAET).

See also 

Kuwait Oil Company
Economy of Kuwait

References

External links
Official Kuwait National Petroleum Company website
Projects Retrieved 7 June 2008

Oil and gas companies of Kuwait
Energy companies established in 1960
Non-renewable resource companies established in 1960
1960 establishments in Kuwait